Oberea conica is a species of beetle in the family Cerambycidae. It was described by Wang, Jiang and Zheng in 2002, originally as Oberea conicus. It is known from Laos.

References

conica
Beetles described in 2002